Tyndis was an ancient Indian seaport/harbor-town mentioned in the Graeco-Roman writings. According to the Periplus of the Erythraean Sea, Tyndis was located north of port Muziris in the country of the Cerobothra (present-day Kerala). 

Previously, Tyndis was attributed to Thondi, a region ruled by the Pandya country in present day Tamil Nadu. Alternatively, the Cheras of the early historical period (c. second century BCE - c. third century CE) had their original centre at Karur in the interior Tamil Nadu and harbours at Muziris and Tyndis on the Malabar coast (Kerala). Tyndis was a satellite feeding port to Muziris, according to the Periplus. It was a major center of trade, next only to Muziris, between the Cheras and the Roman Empire. Pliny the Elder (1st century CE) states that the port of Tyndis was located at the northwestern border of Keprobotos (Chera dynasty). The North Malabar region, which lies north of the port at Tyndis, was ruled by the kingdom of Ezhimala during Sangam period. According to the Periplus, a region known as Limyrike began at Naura and Tyndis. However the Ptolemy mentions only Tyndis as the Limyrike's starting point. The region probably ended at Kanyakumari; it thus roughly corresponds to the present-day Malabar Coast. 

There are references to a port with the name Tondi, on the Kerala coast, in the early Tamil texts. It was under the control of the Chera rulers (probably via/under a collateral branch). No archaeological evidence has been found for Tyndis.

Different variations of the name 
 Periplus of the Erythraean Sea - Tyndis
 Pliny the Elder (Natural History) - Tyndis
 Peutinger Table - Tondis
 Claudius Ptolemy (Geography) -  Tyndis

Sources

Graeco-Roman descriptions 

 Periplus of the Erythraean Sea (c. 1st century), 54-56, mentions Tyndis as "a well known village on the coast".
 "Naura and Tyndis, the first ports of trade of Limyrike"
 "Tyndis, a well known village on the coast, is in the kingdom of Keprobotos..."
 Tyndis is situated 500 stades (92 km) north to Muziris by river and sea. 
 Pliny the Elder (1st century) - "the Caelobothras ruled a kingdom extending to Tyndis (on the north-west)".
 By the time Claudius Ptolemy (2nd century) wrote, Tyndis had grown large enough for him to call it (Geography 7.1.8) a town (polis).
 Tabula Peutingeriana locates Tondis north of Muziris (north of Templ Augusti and Lacus Muziris).

Early Tamil texts 

There are references to a port with the name Tondi, on the Kerala coast, in the early Tamil texts. It was under the control of the Chera rulers (probably via/under a collateral branch). No archaeological evidence has been found for Tyndis.

Location 
The location of Muziris provides clues for the location Tyndis, which was 500 stades (92 km) north of it (by river and sea). 

In ancient times, Tyndis held close connections with Chera kingdom. The historic archives documented the Chera Kingdom as the powerful Tamil Kingdom whose turf extends the entire present-day state of Kerala, Kanyakumari and expanding up to Kongu Nadu.

The perfect array of religions, customs, languages, and traditions over the flow of time reflects in the prosperous heritage of Malabar. Upon reaching the Tyndis port, they further traveled to the inlands using smaller boats and then by carts to the hill stations of Wayanad or Coorg, and then on wards in search of spices and precious herbs.

The exact location of the port is still unknown. Possible candidates include the following modern locations:

Beypore-Chaliyam-Kadalundi-Vallikkunnu-Parappanangadi-Tanur
About 117 km north of Kodungallur
Mouth of Chaliyar as well as Kadalundi River
Kadalundi = Kadal + Tundi (?)
An open harbour entrance through a channel 40 feet deep (that does not need dredging)
Ponnani
About 74 km north of Kodungallur
Mouth of Bharathappuzha
Opposite to the Palakkad Gap

See also

 Muziris

References

Bibliography

External links 

 Muziris Heritage
 https://www.tyndisheritage.com/tyndis-the-port/

Ancient India
Former populated places in India
History of Kerala
Lost ancient cities and towns